Ukrainian Baroque, or Cossack Baroque or Mazepa Baroque, is an architectural style that was widespread in the Ukrainian lands in the 17th and 18th centuries. It was the result of a combination of local architectural traditions and European Baroque.

History

Thanks to influences from Western Europe, from the late 16th century the lands of modern Ukraine came under the influence of the secularized Baroque form of art and architecture, which was still largely unknown in Moscow. According to the historian Serhii Plokhy, Peter Mogila, the Metropolitan of Kyiv from 1633 to 1647, was crucial in developing the style as part of his drive to reform the Ukrainian Orthodox Church and adapt the Church to the challenges of the Reformation and Counter-Reformation. Ukrainian Baroque reached its apogee in the time of the Cossack Hetman Ivan Mazepa, from 1687 to 1708. Mazepa Baroque is an original synthesis of Western European Baroque architectural forms and Ukrainian national Baroque architectural traditions.

Style

Ukrainian Baroque is distinct from the Western European Baroque in having more moderate ornamentation and simpler forms, and as such was considered more constructivist. Many Ukrainian Baroque buildings have been preserved, including several buildings in Kyiv Pechersk Lavra and the Vydubychi Monastery in Kyiv. The historian Andrew Wilson has identified All Saints' Church, the Cathedral of the Assumption and the Trinity Gate within the Kyiv Pechersk Lavra as good examples of the style, along with St. Michael's Golden-Domed Monastery in Kyiv and St. Catherine's in Chernihiv. The exterior of St. Sophia Cathedral in Kyiv also underwent significant alterations in the Baroque style. Another example of the style is the Church of St. Elias in Subotiv, where Bohdan Khmelnytsky buried his son Tymish in 1653 after his death in battle. The church is also depicted on the ₴5 note.

The best examples of Baroque painting in Ukraine are the church paintings in the Holy Trinity Church of the Kyiv Pechersk Lavra. Rapid development in engraving techniques occurred during the Ukrainian Baroque period. Advances utilized a complex system of symbolism, allegories, heraldic signs, and sumptuous ornamentation. From the 17th century onwards, there was also a flowering of baroque literature in Ukraine, which in turn helped lay the foundations for Russian secular literature.

Notable architects

The Ukrainian Baroque sculptor Johann Georg Pinsel, who was active during the mid-18th century in Galicia, was the subject of a special exhibition at the Louvre in Paris in 2012–2013. Pinsel, who demonstrated a unique, masterful expressiveness of form and a highly personal characterization of drapery is now recognized as a leading figure in European Baroque sculpture. The Russian Baroque architect Bartolomeo Rastrelli, who is best known for designing the Winter Palace in Saint Petersburg and Catherine Palace in Tsarskoe Selo, also made contributions to the Ukrainian Baroque style, designing St. Andrew's Church and Mariinskyi Palace in Kyiv. The palace is now used as the official residence of the President of Ukraine. The Galician-Italian architect Bernard Merettini designed the ornate St. George's Cathedral, Lviv, used as a mother church by the Ukrainian Greek Catholic Church.

Influence

Certain features of the Ukrainian Baroque influenced the Naryshkin Baroque movement in the 17th–18th century in Moscow. Modern Ukrainian church buildings, such as Troeshchina Cathedral, are also built in this style, but it is not typical for Ukrainian Baroque. Elements of the Ukrainian Baroque style were later adapted by the Ukrainian-Canadian community when building their own churches, adapted for the wooden church architecture more typical in Canadian-Ukrainian churches.

Gallery

See also
Ukrainian architecture
Architecture of Kievan Rus'
List of World Heritage Sites in Ukraine

References

External links
 Ukrainian baroque songs and music. Audio files of baroque songs
 
 Baroque in Encyclopedia of Ukraine
Українська гравюра бароко: Майстер Ілля, Олександр Тарасевич, Леонтій Тарасевич, Іван Щирський Степовик Д. В.

 
Baroque architectural styles
Cossack Hetmanate
Architecture in Ukraine by period or style